Diddy TV is a British children's sketch comedy series on CBBC. It stars Richard McCourt and Dominic Wood (Dick and Dom). It is a sequel series to the Diddy Dick and Dom sketches on Dick & Dom in da Bungalow and Diddy Movies. The series features various parodies of television series including Top of the Pops and The Great British Bake Off. Series 1 began on 14 March 2016, Series 2 began on 20 June 2016, Series 3 began on 19 March 2018 and Series 4 began on 25 June 2018. Many of the cast have been in other Dick and Dom sketch series or the sitcom The Legend of Dick and Dom.

Premise
The Diddy Movies boss, Larry Bingbongberger, was bankrupted because his movies were a disaster. But with the last of his money, he quits making movies and launches a television station for Diddy Dick and Dom on channel 6597423. It is filled with crazy and silly entertainment, sports and parodies shows like Diddy Doctor Who, Diddy Pops, Deadly Diddy 60, Diddydown and even an American sitcom RoboPop as well as adverts, most of them starring Dick and Dom.

Cast
Richard McCourt as Diddy Dick/Various
Dominic Wood as Diddy Dom/Various
Ted Robbins as Larry Bingbongberger (formerly Weinsteinberger but changed in the opening theme and edited out of other instances of the name being mentioned throughout the show due to the Harvey Weinstein scandal)/Various
Ian Kirkby as DI Harry Batt/Various
Paris Atkins as Various
Dave Chapman as Various
Bob Golding as Various
Darragh Mortell as Various
Sabrina Sandhu as Various
Gail Kemp as Various
Kate Malyon as Various
Sabrina Sandhu as Various
Inel Tomlinson as Various
Eve Munyanyi as Various
Louise Woodward as Various

Guests
The guest stars often appear between the sketches with Larry Bingbongberger in his house. Some episodes have Dick and Dom in Da Bungalow character Mr. Choosy. Guests play Diddy versions of themselves (except Reece Shearsmith). In series 3 new guest stars appear with Diddy Dick and Dom on Diddy Chat. Some guests appear in more than one episode.

Reece Shearsmith as Mr. Stockholm
Ashley Roberts
Joseph Garrett
Bruno Tonioli
Eamonn Holmes
Barney Harwood
Hazel Irvine
Shaun Murphy
Craig Revel Horwood
Melvin Odoom
Jake Mitchell
Paul Zerdin
Sally Lindsay
Radzi Chinyanganya
Michelle Gayle
Louis Payne
Colson Smith
Lauren Layfield

Episodes

Series 1 (2016)

Series 2 (2016)

Series 3 (2018)

Series 4 (2018)

Shorts (2016–17)
A series of shorts are uploaded on to CBBC's website and YouTube channel. Some are Diddy Chat, where Diddy Dick and Dom interview a celebrity. Others are parodies of popular Internet videos, such as Unboxings and Carpool Karaoke

Release
Series 1 began on 14 March 2016 and ended on 25 March 2016. Series 2 began on 20 June 2016 and ended on 30 June 2016. There was a Christmas special on 16 December 2016.

Series 3 started on 19 March 2018 and ended on 31 March 2018. Series 4 started on 25 June 2018 and ended on 5 July 2018.

Every episode was available to purchase on the BBC Store.

References

External links
 Website

2016 British television series debuts
2018 British television series endings
2010s British children's television series
British television shows featuring puppetry
English-language television shows
CBBC shows
BBC children's television shows
BBC television sketch shows
British children's comedy television series
2010s British television sketch shows
Television series by BBC Studios